Bhagwati Devi (6 November 1936) was a political and social worker and a Member of Parliament elected from the Gaya district constituency in the Indian  state of Bihar being a Janta Dal United candidate.

Early life
Bhagwati Devi was born on 6 November 1936 in village Mithaiya which comes under Aurangabad district in Bihar. Bhagwati is the daughter of a Musahar (literally 'rat-eater' or rat-catcher) community.

Career
She became a Member of the Bihar Legislative Assembly in 1969. During 1995–96, she served as—
 Member of various Committees, Bihar Legislative Assembly
 Member, Committee on Electricity Board, Bihar
She was elected to the 11th Lok Sabha in 1996.

Special Interests And Social Activities
She works towards the upliftment of the downtrodden and weaker sections of society. She has also contributed towards the welfare of women and struggle for social justice. She also devotes personal time to Satsangs.

Other information
Bhagwati participated in the freedom struggle and was imprisoned a number of times for participating in political agitations. She has held various position in Samajwadi Party  and  Janata Dal. She has been associated  with Ram Manohar Lohia, Jayaprakash Narayan and  Karpoori Thakur. Her biography titled "Dharati ki Beti" is written by Ram Pyare Singh.

References

India MPs 1996–1997
Lok Sabha members from Bihar
Articles created or expanded during Women's History Month (India) - 2014
People from Aurangabad district, Bihar
1936 births
Living people
Women in Bihar politics
Janata Dal (United) politicians
Samajwadi Party politicians
Janata Dal politicians
20th-century Indian women politicians
20th-century Indian politicians
Women members of the Lok Sabha